Calum Waters may refer to:

 Calum Waters (footballer) (born 1996), Scottish footballer
 Calum Waters (rugby union) (born 1996), English rugby union player